Between 1960 and 1978 the 1. Amateurliga Schwarzwald-Bodensee was the highest football division in the southern parts of the Württembergian Football Association and a level three division of the German football league system.

Founding 
The division was formed in 1960 in the southern half of Württemberg by splitting the previous 1. Amateurliga Württemberg into the northern division 1. Amateurliga Nordwürttemberg and the southern division 1. Amateurliga Schwarzwald-Bodensee. Additionally, several teams from the 1. Amateurliga Südbaden joined the division.

The founding members of the 1. Amateurliga Schwarzwald-Bodensee were:
From 1. Amateurliga Württemberg: SC Schwenningen, VfR Schwenningen, FC Wangen 1905, FV Ebingen
From 1. Amateurliga Südbaden: FC 08 Villingen, FC Konstanz, FC Radolfzell
From 2. Amateurliga Württemberg: FV Ravensburg, FC Tailfingen, VfB Friedrichshafen, TSV Blumberg, Olympia Laupheim, TSV Burladingen, SV Spaichingen, FC Furtwangen, FC Überlingen

Promotion/relegation

The winner of the 1. Amateurliga Schwarzwald-Bodensee was not automatically promoted. Instead the division champions gained entry to a promotion tournament to the superseding level two division.

Upon its inception, it was a feeder league to the 2. Oberliga Süd. From 1963 to 1974 it became a feeder to the Regionalliga Süd and finally, after 1974, to the 2. Bundesliga Süd. During all its 18 years of existence, the 1. Amateurliga Schwarzwald-Bodensee always was a level three division of the German football league system and along with the Nordwürttemberg division the top flight of the Württembergian Football Association.

Disbanding 
In 1974, five clubs belonging to the South Badenese Football Association left the 1. Amateurliga Schwarzwald-Bodensee to join the 1. Amateurliga Südbaden instead, these clubs being FC Villingen, DJK Konstanz, FC Konstanz, FC Gottmadingen und FC Singen.

In 1978, the new level three Oberliga Baden-Württemberg was formed to allow direct promotion to the 2. Bundesliga Süd for the amateur champions of the Baden-Württemberg state. The teams placed one to five in the last edition of the 1. Amateurliga Schwarzwald-Bodensee gained entry to the new Oberliga while the teams placed six to thirteen remained in the division, that was merged with the 1. Amateurliga Nordwürttemberg and renamed into Verbandsliga Württemberg, now the fourth tier of the German football league system. The last four teams were relegated to the Landesliga Württemberg.

Admitted to the new Oberliga were SSV Reutlingen, FV Biberach, FC Tailfingen, FV Ravensburg and VfB Friedrichshafen

To the new Verbandsliga (previously labelled 1. Amateurliga): BSV Schwenningen, SV Tübingen, FC Wangen 1905, FV Ebingen, TSV Ofterdingen, SpVgg Lindau, FC Tuttlingen and TSG Tübingen.

Relegated to Landesliga (previously labelled 2. Amateurliga): SV Kreßbronn, TSV Tettnang, SG Aulendorf, SV Weingarten

Winners of the 1. Amateurliga Schwarzwald-Bodensee 

 Bold denotes team gained promotion.

Non-Württemberg clubs in the league
The SpVgg Lindau was participating in the 1. Amateurliga Schwarzwald-Bodensee from 1962 to 1978, although it is actually a Bavarian club. The club is  playing in the Württemberg league system because Lindau is geographically closer to the Schwarzwald-Bodensee region than most of Bavaria.

During its 18 year of existence, three clubs were always present in the league, the FC Tailfingen, FC Wangen and FV Ebingen.

References

Sources
 Deutschlands Fußball in Zahlen,  An annual publication with tables and results from the Bundesliga to Verbandsliga/Landesliga, publisher: DSFS
 Kicker Almanach,  The yearbook on German football from Bundesliga to Oberliga, since 1937, published by the Kicker Sports Magazine
 Süddeutschlands Fussballgeschichte in Tabellenform 1897-1988  History of Southern German football in tables, publisher & author: Ludolf Hyll
 Die Deutsche Liga-Chronik 1945-2005  History of German football from 1945 to 2005 in tables, publisher: DSFS, published: 2006

External links 
 Das deutsche Fussball Archiv  Historic German league tables

1978 disestablishments in Germany
Football competitions in Baden-Württemberg
Defunct association football leagues in Germany
1960 establishments in West Germany
Sports leagues established in 1960
Ger

de:Fußball-Verbandsliga Württemberg